Kamil Gradek (born 17 September 1990) is a Polish racing cyclist, who currently rides for UCI WorldTeam . He rode at the 2014 UCI Road World Championships. In May 2019, he was named in the startlist for the 2019 Giro d'Italia.

Major results

2011
 1st  Time trial, National Under-23 Road Championships
 5th Coupe des Carpathes
2012
 1st  Time trial, National Under-23 Road Championships
2013
 2nd Memoriał Henryka Łasaka
 7th Overall Szlakiem Grodów Piastowskich
 7th Overall Tour of Małopolska
 10th GP Sakia El Hamra, Les Challenges de la Marche Verte
2014
 1st  Overall Tour of China I
1st Stage 3
 1st Memoriał Andrzeja Trochanowskiego
 2nd Visegrad 4 Bicycle Race – GP Czech Republic
 3rd Overall Tour of China II
 4th Overall Szlakiem Grodów Piastowskich
 4th Overall Course de la Solidarité Olympique
1st Stage 2
 5th Visegrad 4 Bicycle Race – GP Hungary
 8th Overall Tour of Małopolska
 9th Overall Okolo Slovenska
 9th Puchar Ministra Obrony Narodowej
2015
 2nd Time trial, National Road Championships
 2nd Rund um Sebnitz
 6th Overall GP Internacional do Guadiana
 9th Velothon Stockholm
 10th Time trial, European Games
2016
 8th Overall Tour of Estonia
 10th Overall Dookoła Mazowsza
2017
 1st  Overall Ronde van Midden-Nederland
1st Stage 1 (TTT)
 7th Overall Szlakiem Walk Majora Hubala
2018
 1st Stage 3a (TTT) Sibiu Cycling Tour
 3rd Overall Szlakiem Walk Majora Hubala
 5th Overall Dookoła Mazowsza
 6th Visegrad 4 Bicycle Race – GP Slovakia
 10th Nokere Koerse
2019
 2nd Time trial, National Road Championships
 4th Overall Okolo Slovenska
2020
 1st  Time trial, National Road Championships
2022
 2nd Time trial, National Road Championships

Grand Tour general classification results timeline

References

External links
 
 

1990 births
Living people
Polish male cyclists
People from Myszków County
Sportspeople from Silesian Voivodeship
European Games competitors for Poland
Cyclists at the 2015 European Games